Charles Henry Coote, 7th Earl of Mountrath PC (c. 1725 – 2 March 1802), styled Viscount Coote until 1744, was an Irish peer and landowner.

Styled Viscount Coote from birth, he was the son of Algernon Coote, 6th Earl of Mountrath, by Lady Diana Newport, daughter of Richard Newport, 2nd Earl of Bradford. He succeeded his father in the earldom in 1744. In 1761 he was sworn of the Irish Privy Council. In 1800, with no legitimate heirs and with the earldom heading for extinction, Mountrath was created Baron Castle Coote, in the County of Roscommon, in the Irish peerage, with a special remainder to his kinsman, Charles Coote.

Lord Mountrath died in March 1802. He had no legitimate male issue and the earldom and its associated titles created in 1660 died with him. The barony of Castle Coote passed according to the special remainder to his kinsman, Charles Coote. The baronetcy of Castle Cuffe also held by the Earl passed to another kinsman, Sir Charles Coote, 9th Baronet.

Lord Mountrath's illegitimate son, Charles, was born on 30 July 1761 to his then mistress, Mary Preston.

References

1802 deaths
Members of the Privy Council of Ireland
Charles Henry
1720s births
Earls of Mountrath